The 2012 Wokingham Borough Council election took place on Thursday 3 May 2012, the same day as other 2012 United Kingdom local elections, to elect members of Wokingham Unitary Council in Berkshire, England. One third of the council was up for election and the Conservative Party stayed in overall control of the council.

After the election, the composition of the council was:
Conservative 43
Liberal Democrat 10
Independent 1

Background
A total of 74 candidates contested the 18 seats which were up for election. These included 18 Conservative, 18 Liberal Democrat, 14 Labour, 14 Green Party, 8 United Kingdom Independence Party and 3 independent candidates.

Issues in the election included:
Recent changes to waste collections
Some recent controversial planning applications

Election result
The Conservatives retained control of the council despite losing 2 seats: 1 to the Liberal Democrats in Winnersh, and Charvil to an Independent. The Liberal Democrats held the 3 seats they defended in Bulmershe and Whitegates, Twyford and Loddon. However their gain in Winnersh was cancelled out a few hours later when Sue Smith resigned from the Liberal Democrats to finish her term as an Independent.

There were a total of 31,640 votes cast, including 183 spoiled ballots.

Ward results

References

2012 English local elections
2012
2010s in Berkshire